The 1920–21 season was the 2nd official football season for the club. They competed against 9 other teams in the İstanbul Sports League. As the defending champions, they came 1st place in their group and defeated Darüssafaka in the final, earning their 2nd ever championship.

Season
In the İstanbul Sports League there were 2 groups: Group A and Group B. Beşiktaş was in group A.

Group A

Final

External links
http://www.angelfire.com/nj/sivritepe/5758/artlIST.html

Beşiktaş J.K. seasons
Besiktas